Jubril Adewale "Wale" Tinubu  (born 26 June 1967) is a Nigerian business executive and lawyer, who is the group chief executive of Oando PLC. 

He began his career in 1990 as an attorney, specialising in corporate and petroleum law assignments. In 1994, he co-founded Ocean & Oil Group and guided its strategic development from an oil trading and shipping company.

Education
Tinubu had his primary education in Lagos state and later obtained the West African School Certificate in 1983 from the Federal Government College, Odogbolu. He studied law at the University of Liverpool and obtained a Master of Laws degree from the London School of Economics. He returned to Nigeria at 22 to attend the Nigerian Law School in order to qualify to practice and was called to the Nigerian bar in 1990.

Career
Tinubu began his career with his family law firm, K. O. Tinubu and Co, where he specialised in corporate and petroleum law. In 1994, he co-founded Ocean and Oil Limited, an oil company located in Nigeria.

Awards and nominations
 Conferred with the honour of Commander of the Order of the Niger (CON) in 2022 by the Federal Government of Nigeria under the administration of President Muhammadu Buhari.
 "The King of African Oil" by Forbes magazine
 One of the Top Ten CEOs in the world by ASKMEN
 Young global leader by the World Economic Forum (January 2007) 
 "African Business Leader of the Year" by Africa Investor (2011)
 "Leadership" Business Person of the Year 2014
 "Africa Executive of the Year" by Oil Council (2015)
 "Entrepreneur of the Year" West Africa by Ernst & Young (2015)

Personal life
Adewale Tinubu is the nephew of Chief Bola Tinubu, a Nigerian politician and former governor of Lagos State, the national leader of the All Progressives Congress, and the president-elect of Nigeria.

References

1967 births
Living people
Nigerian Muslims
20th-century Nigerian lawyers
Businesspeople from Lagos
Yoruba businesspeople
Alumni of the University of Liverpool
Alumni of the London School of Economics
20th-century Nigerian businesspeople
21st-century Nigerian businesspeople
Nigerian businesspeople in the oil industry
Wale
Nigerian Law School alumni
Federal Government College, Odogbolu alumni